Ahmed Chahrour is a Syrian wrestler. He competed in the men's Greco-Roman 52 kg at the 1968 Summer Olympics.

References

Year of birth missing (living people)
Living people
Syrian male sport wrestlers
Olympic wrestlers of Syria
Wrestlers at the 1968 Summer Olympics
Place of birth missing (living people)
20th-century Syrian people